The Secret Life of Bees is a fiction book by the American author Sue Monk Kidd. Set in 1964, it is a coming-of-age story about loss, betrayal, and the interracial landscape of the civil rights era of the American South. The book received critical acclaim and was a New York Times bestseller. It won the 2004 Book Sense Book of the Year Awards (Paperback), and was nominated for the Orange Broadband Prize for Fiction.

The book was adapted into a 2008 film of the same name directed by Gina Prince-Bythewood.

Plot

Set in 1964 in the fictitious town of Sylvan, South Carolina, The  Secret Life of Bees tells the story of a 14-year-old white girl, Lily Melissa Owens, whose life has been shaped around the blurred memory of the afternoon her mother was killed. Lily lives in a house with her abusive father, whom she refers to as T. Ray. They have a no-nonsense maid, Rosaleen, who is a mother figure for Lily. 

The book opens with Lily's discovery of bees in her bedroom. Then, after Rosaleen is arrested for pouring her bottle of "snuff juice" on three white men, Lily breaks her out of the hospital and they decide to leave town. The two begin hitch-hiking toward Tiburon, South Carolina, a place written on the back of an image of the Virgin Mary as a black woman, which Deborah, Lily's mother, had owned. They spend a night in the woods with little food and little hope before reaching Tiburon. There, they buy lunch at a general store, and Lily recognizes a picture of the same "Black Mary" but on the side of a jar of honey. Rosaleen and Lily receive directions to the origin of the honey, the Boatwright residence. They are introduced to the Boatwright sisters, the makers of the honey: August, May, and June, who are all black. When Lily meets the sisters she makes up a story about being an orphan. Believing Lily's Story, August, June, and May invite Lily and Rosaleen to stay with them.

They learn the ways of the Boatwrights, as well as the ways of bee keeping. With a new home and a new family for the time being, Lily learns more about the Black Madonna honey that the sisters make. She begins working as August's bee keeping apprentice to repay her for her kindness, while Rosaleen works around the house. Lily finds out that May had a twin sister, April, who died by suicide with their father's shotgun when they were younger. She watches June's ongoing flirtations with, and refusals of marriage to, her boyfriend Neil. Lily and Rosaleen also get to see the sisters' religious ceremonies. The sisters hold service at their house which they call "The Daughters of Mary." They keep a statue of the "Black Mary", or "our lady of chains", which was actually a figurehead from the bow of an ancient ship, and August tells the story of how a man by the name of Obadiah, who was enslaved, found this figure. The enslaved men and women thought that God had answered their prayers asking for rescue, and "to send them consolation" and "to send them freedom". It gave them hope, and the figure had been passed down for generations.

Lily eventually meets Zach, August's godson. They soon develop intimate feelings for each other. They share goals with each other while working the hives. Both Lily and Zach find their goals nearly impossible to meet but still encourage each other to attempt them. Zach wants to be the "ass-busting lawyer", which means he would be the first black attorney in the area. Lily wants to be a short story writer.

Lily attempts to tell August the truth but is interrupted by Zach, who takes her for a honey run. They stop at a store to pick up a few things. Zach gets arrested after one of his friends, who they had met at the store, throws a coke bottle at a white man and none of them will tell who did it. Zach and his friends are arrested and put in jail. The Boatwright house decides not to tell May in fear of an unbearable emotional episode. The secret does not stay hidden for long and May becomes catatonic with depression. May leaves the house and goes missing. August, June, Lily and Rosaleen go looking to find her and end up find her lying dead in the river with a rock on her chest. It looks to be a suicide, due to May's depression from Zach being arrested.

A vigil is held that lasts four days. In that time, Zach is freed from jail with no charges, and black cloth is draped over the beehives to symbolize the mourning. May's suicide letter is found and in it she says, "It's my time to die, and it's your time to live. Don't mess it up." August interprets this as urging June to marry Neil. May is later buried. Life begins to turn back to normal after a time of grieving, bringing the Boatwright house back together. June, after several rejections, agrees to give her hand in marriage to Neil. Zach vows to Lily that they will be together someday and that they will both achieve their goals.

Lily finally finds out the truth about her mother. August was her mother's nanny, and helped raise her. After her marriage to T. Ray began to sour, Deborah left and went to stay with the Boatwrights. She eventually decided to leave him permanently and returned to their house to collect Lily. While Deborah was packing to leave, T. Ray returned home. Their ensuing argument turned into a physical fight during which Deborah got a gun. After a brief struggle, the gun fell to the floor, which Lily picked up and the gun accidentally discharged, killing Deborah.

While Lily is coming to terms with this information, T. Ray shows up at the Boatwright residence, also known as the pink house, to take her back home. Lily refuses, and T. Ray flies into an enraged rampage. He has a violent flashback which brings him around. August steps in and offers to let Lily stay with her. T. Ray gives in and agrees. However, right before T. Ray leaves the Boatwright house, Lily asks him what really happened the day her mother died. T. Ray confirms that Lily was the one to, accidentally, kill her mother Deborah.

Characters
 Lily Melissa Owens: The 14—-year-old narrator of the story. Lily is the daughter and only child of Deborah and T. Ray Owens. Lily loves to read and write.
 T. Ray Owens: The abusive father of Lily and the widower of Deborah Fontanel Owens. He is the main antagonist of this novel.
 Deborah Fontanel Owens: The deceased mother of Lily Owens and wife of T. Ray Owens. Deborah died in a gun accident when Lily was 4. Deborah is buried in Virginia. 
 Rosaleen Daise: The black maid of Lily's household and other neighbors, also acts as Lily's protector and mother figure. She is Lily's best friend for most of the book.
 August Boatwright: The eldest of the Boatwright sisters, a beekeeper, and a well-respected businesswoman in the community. August was Deborah's best friend. 
 June Boatwright: The sister of May Boatwright and August Boatwright. She is a school teacher and musician. June is more serious and stubborn than August and May. 
 May Boatwright: The sister of August and June Boatwright. She had a twin sister, April, who committed suicide when she was 15, and as a result of April's death she is emotionally sensitive.  
 Zachary "Zach" Taylor: August's godson who helps her with the hives. He is a football player who attends the local black high school. He wants to become a lawyer. Zach is Lily's main love interest. 
 Neil: The principal at the school where June teaches. He has proposed multiple times to June. He eventually becomes June's fiance.
 The Daughters of Mary: Cressie, Queenie and her daughter Violet, Lunelle, Mabelee, and Sugar-Girl who attends with her husband, Otis, the one man of the group. They are followers of Our Lady of Chains.

Themes 
The novel has many themes, including religion, labour, nature, racism, orphanhood and abandonment, mental health and suicide. Lily's search for a mother figure is a part of the greater journey into her own identity. Lily learns about self-acceptance and self-forgiveness during this journey. The Bildungsroman showcases Lily's struggle to understand her role in her family and the world and work through her trauma. Another theme is the historical setting and racism in 1960s American South. The novel mentions police mistreatment of Black people, the Civil Rights Act of 1964, and the controversy of interracial relations. Mental health is another theme prevalent in the story. April and May, as well as Lily's mother, are affected by various mental illnesses. Although this is not stated directly, May exhibits symptoms of autism spectrum disorder (hyperempathy, restricted and stereotyped behaviour, speech abnormalities).

Symbolism 
There are a couple big symbols and motifs in “The Secret Life of Bees." One major symbol is the bees and bee-related objects. Bees are a main symbol and motif in the novel. Bees are a symbol of two main things: Guidance and the power of a female community. This is seen in the theme. A major theme is that Lily is looking for a connection to her mother or some mother figure. In the story, there are many strong women she meets. She not only grows up with Rosalee, who is a surrogate mother to Lily, but she also meets the Boatwright Sister and the Daughters of Mary who enhance this symbol of power in a female community in relation to bees. 

Bees can also symbolize organization or “living in a civilized community.”  This can be connected to the black community and specifically the Boatwright sisters in this novel. Bees are very organized, and every bee needs to do its job. In the novel, there is a quote which says, “when a queen bee is taken from a hive, the other bees notice her absence” and it is very similar with the Boatwright sisters. Once May’s twin, April, died, May was never the same. She was emotionally sensitive after her twin passed. Once May took her own life, the Boatwright sisters, once again, had to learn how to move on and live with a loss and “missing bees.” 

Honey represents wisdom and knowledge. In the plot, Lily is looking for the black Mary that is on a honey jar, and after finding the source of this honey, The Boatwright Sisters take Lily and Rosaleen in, and begin to share their wisdom and knowledge. Wisdom and knowledge about bees, life, Lily’s dad, T. Ray, and Lily’s mother, Deborah.

Reception and adaptations
The reception of the book was generally positive. Although the novel does include the underlying theme of the civil rights movement, USA Today felt the novel focused more on Lily's journey towards "self-acceptance, faith and freedom". The novel was originally published in 2001, and has since sold more than six million copies and has been published in 35 countries. It also stayed on the New York Times best seller list for two and a half years.  In 2004, it was named the "Book Sense Paperback of the Year". It was also one of Good Morning America'''s "Read-This" Book club picks, and was nominated for the Orange Prize in England.

The book was adapted into a film in 2008, directed by Gina Prince-Bythewood and produced by Will Smith, with Jada Pinkett Smith as the executive producer. Queen Latifah played August Boatwright, Dakota Fanning played Lily, Alicia Keys played June Boatwright, Jennifer Hudson played Rosaleen, and Sophie Okonedo played May Boatwright.

The book has been adapted as a musical. A workshop was produced by New York Stage and Film & Vassar in 2017. The world premiere musical adaptation of The Secret Life of Bees'' was held at the Off-Broadway Atlantic Theater Company on May 12, 2019 in previews, with the official opening on June 13. The musical's book is written by Lynn Nottage, with music by Duncan Sheik and lyrics by Susan Birkenhead. The musical is directed by Sam Gold and features Saycon Sengbloh as Rosaleen, Elizabeth Teeter as Lily, and LaChanze, Eisa Davis and Anastacia McCleskey as the Boatwight beekeeping sisters.

Notes

References

External links
 

2001 American novels
African-American novels
Feminist novels
Novels set in South Carolina
Fiction set in 1964
Novels about racism
Fiction about beekeeping
American novels adapted into films
American bildungsromans
2001 debut novels